Holmium(III) chloride is the inorganic compound with the formula HoCl3. It is a common salt but is mainly used in research. It exhibits the same color-changing behavior seen in holmium oxide, being a yellow in natural lighting and a bright pink color in fluorescent lighting.

Preparation
It forms upon union of the elements, but a more commonly used method involves heating a mixture of holmium(III) oxide and ammonium chloride at 200-250 °C:
Ho2O3  +  6 NH4Cl   →   2 HoCl3  +  6 NH3  +  2 H2O

Structure
In the solid state it has the YCl3 layer structure.

References

Holmium compounds
Chlorides
Lanthanide halides